is a 2017 Japanese war film directed by Nobuhiko Ōbayashi, based on a 1937 novel by Kazuo Dan. The film tells a story of the purity of youth beset by the chaos of war, inspired by Obayashi's own childhood. It revolves around Toshihiko, a sixteen-year-old kid who moves in with his aunt in Karatsu, and develops friendships and romances with the inhabitants of the town as World War II rages. The film was originally conceived during the 1970s, before Obayashi made his feature film directorial debut with House (1977), but was not produced for another 40 years. Before production, Obayashi was diagnosed with stage-four cancer and was only given a few months to live.

Hanagatami received acclaim, garnering numerous awards, including the Best Film Award at the 72nd Mainichi Film Awards. It was praised for its exuberant and vibrant visuals, its experimental and psychedelic direction and editing, its strong anti-war message and its sense of personalness. It is the third installment in a thematic trilogy of modern anti-war films by Obayashi, along with Casting Blossoms to the Sky (2012) and Seven Weeks (2014).

Plot 
In the spring of 1941, sixteen-year-old Toshihiko leaves Amsterdam to attend school in Karatsu, a small town on the western coast of Japan, where his aunt Keiko cares for his ailing cousin Mina. Immersed in the seaside's nature and culture, Toshihiko soon befriends the town's other extraordinary adolescents as they all contend with the war's inescapable gravitational pull.

Cast 
 Shunsuke Kubozuka as Toshihiko Sakakiyama
 Shinnosuke Mitsushima as Ukai 
 Keishi Nagatsuka as Kira
 Tokio Emoto as Aso
 Honoka Yahagi as Mina Ema
 Hirona Yamazaki as Akine 
 Mugi Kadowaki as Chitose
 Takako Tokiwa as Keiko Ema
 Takehiro Murata as Professor Yamauchi
 Tetsuya Takeda as Dr. Ichijo

References

External links 
 Official website
 
 

2017 films
2010s Japanese films
Films directed by Nobuhiko Obayashi
Japanese war films
2010s war films
Films scored by Kousuke Yamashita
Japanese World War II films